HD 166006, also known as HR 6778, is a solitary orange-hued star located in the southern constellation Telescopium. It has an apparent magnitude of 6.07, making it barely visible to the naked eye. Based on Gaia DR2 parallax measurements, the object is located 582 light years away.

HD 166006 has a stellar classification of K1 III CN2, which indicates that it is an evolved red giant with a strong overabundance of cyano radicals in its spectrum, making it a CN star. It has 1.24 times the mass of the Sun and radiates 165 times the luminosity of the Sun from its enlarged photosphere at an effective temperature of 4,529 K.  The star is slightly metal deficient ([Fe/H] = −0.07) and spins a little too slowly to be accurately measured.HD 166006 has an optical 11th magnitude companion located 1.8" away along a position angle of 271° as of 2015.

References

Telescopium (constellation)
166006
089096
6778
K-type giants
Double stars
CD-47 12098